Jennings Cottage is a historic cure cottage located at Saranac Lake in the town of Harrietstown, Franklin County, New York.  It was built about 1897 and modified in 1923 to its present form.  It is a bungalow style dwelling with a broad, low pitched gable roof with exposed rasters and a large cobblestone chimney.  It features a large two story gable roof dormer over a full inset front verandah supported by Doric order columns.  It was operated as a commercial boarding cottage.

It was listed on the National Register of Historic Places in 1992.

References

Houses on the National Register of Historic Places in New York (state)
Houses completed in 1897
Houses in Franklin County, New York
Bungalow architecture in New York (state)
American Craftsman architecture in New York (state)
National Register of Historic Places in Franklin County, New York